Blue Mountain is an alpine ski resort in Ontario, Canada, 10 km west of Collingwood. It is situated on a section of the Niagara Escarpment about 1 km (0.6 mi.) from Nottawasaga Bay, and is a major destination for skiers from southern Ontario. The local area forms the newly incorporated town of The Blue Mountains, Ontario. On average, Blue Mountain sells more than 750,000 lift tickets per year, making it the third-busiest ski resort in Canada, after Whistler-Blackcomb in British Columbia and Mont Tremblant in Quebec. It is one of the largest resorts in Ontario and has been extensively built out, featuring 42 runs, 16 chairlifts and 3 freestyle terrains.

Established in 1941, the ski resort was later transformed into a year-round resort in 1977. From 1999 to 2007, the resort was under the majority-ownership of Intrawest. During its ownership, the resort underwent major renovations including the installation of high-speed lifts, and a new residential village at the base of the resort. The resort is owned by Alterra Mountain Company after it bought Intrawest in 2017.

History

Jozo Weider was born in Žilina in 1908, in what was then Austria-Hungary present day Slovakia. In his twenties, he built a ski chalet in the Carpathian mountains and lived as an innkeeper, mountain guide and photographer through the 1930s. He also travelled abroad to England to promote the chalet, and was on such a trip in 1939 when World War II began. He telegrammed his wife, Helena, who was still in Czechoslovakia to leave the country. She met Jozo in England with their son, and the family applied for political asylum. The entire family emigrated to Canada later that year, settling in Peace River, Alberta. Later that year Jozo travelled east, working a seasonal job at the Chateau Frontenac as a ski instructor. The next year he moved the entire family to Quebec, working at the  Inn in Sainte-Marguerite-du-Lac-Masson.

While working there he met Peter Campbell who was involved in developing ski areas in Collingwood, and the two started a partnership to develop Blue Mountain. Development started in 1941, with the Weider family moving into an existing farm at the base of the escarpment. The family farmed the fields around the base of the hill during the summers. Weider built a small chalet at what is now the north end of the hill, the "Blue Mountain Lodge", and started clearing trails by hand. A single lift consisted of two sleds pulled up the hill by a cable running on the ground and powered by a truck engine, serving three runs, "Schuss", "Granny" and "Kandahar'. At the time Collingwood was primarily a shipbuilding and apple growing region, and had limited tourist access via road, so the first skiers arrived via train at the nearby Craigleith station.

In 1948 Weider signed an agreement with the Toronto Ski Club and the Blue Mountain Ski club, giving them a 99 year lease for chalet areas just south of the Lodge. Later that year he purchased another  farm to the south, opening that area as the Apple Bowl. The next year the barn on the new land was turned into "The Ski Barn", and became the hill's primary day lodge, drawing the centre of the hill to the south. Weider later sold the Lodge, using the money to fund the purchase of a poma lift which replaced the original sleds between Schuss and Granny in 1955. In 1959 the "Old South Chair" opened at the extreme south end of the hill, the second chair lift in Ontario. The skiable area now covered the entire two and half mile frontage the hill still has to this day, although the most southern  have been closed for extended periods. During development Weider noticed that the soil was mostly clay, and started a hobby making ceramics, which later developed into Blue Mountain Pottery.

Improving economics combined with dramatically improved ski equipment turned skiing into a major sport for the first time in the 1960s. To serve the growing market, a new twenty room Inn was opened near the Ski Barn. In 1966 Weider sold Blue Mountain Pottery and used the money to fund a major expansion, adding three double chairs and replacing the Barn with the new "Central Base Lodge". Weider died in 1971, before the mountain was fully developed. After his death control passed to his son, George. George later became Chairman, and passed day-to-day management to Jozo's son-in-law, Gordon Canning.

The 1970s were a period of major expansion. In 1973 a major snowmaking system was installed, and a ski rental/repair facility was added to the Base Lodge, while a new South Base Lodge was built to spread out the facilities. By the end of the decade there were 17 lifts serving the hill; 3 triple chairs, 5 double chairs, 6 Pomas, one T-bar and a rope tow.

In 1977 they added the Blue Mountain Slide Ride ("Alpine Slide Ride" in recent documents) in order to provide summer income. Riders used the Inn Triple lift to bring themselves and their sled to the top of the hill, selecting one of two tracks to run back down. Speed was controlled with a lever that pressed the wheel down onto the track, doing so lifted the nose off the Teflon runners and increased speed. The Alpine Slide Ride was retired after the 1998-99 winter season.

In 1979 lighting was added on the "Big Baby" and "O-Hill" runs for night skiing, which has since been expanded to major portions of the hill. In 1980 the resort added the Slipper Dipper Water Slide, intertwined with the Slide Ride, and this was expanded again in 1984 with a tube ride. The tube ride was replaced in 1997 with the Raft Rider, a similar waterslide.

In 1980, Blue Mountain purchased Georgian Peaks Club, a smaller ski club just northwest of Blue Mountain and the adjacent beach area for $1. Consisting mostly of advanced terrain, the Peaks is the only ski area in Ontario with enough vertical to host a full-sized international Slalom course. Shuttle buses were available to move between the two base areas, and a single lift ticket was good at both hills. This experiment ended when BMR sold the Peaks (but not the beach) to private members for $1Million on 29 June 1987.

In 1981 attention moved to the north end of the hill again with the completion of the Blue Mountain Inn, a major new development near the original Lodge. The central Base Lodge underwent a major facelift in 1988, and the South Base Lodge was similarly upgraded around this time. Through the 1980s and 1990s, the resort retained this basic layout, with Inn being a major focus of activity at the north end of the hill. The "Coors Silver Bullet" high-speed four-person chairlift was added at the Base Lodge area to improve congestion during peak times, but lift lines remained long over much of the hill and were indicated by delay boards at the base of the lifts.

Recent history 
In 1999, Intrawest Corporation purchased a 50% interest in the ownership of Blue Mountain, sparking off a major expansion process. Drawing development to the middle area again, four high speed six-passenger chairlifts have been installed, one of these replacing the original Silver Bullet, and the other three spread out over the hill. Uphill capacity was dramatically increased with these expansions, and congestion in the lift lines has been greatly reduced.

More dramatic is the development of the Blue Mountain Village area at the Base Lodge. Once again drawing the focus of the hill southward, the Village contains a number of condominiums, hotels, a conference centre, restaurants and other shops and services. Based on a European ski resort theme, the Village is similar to the expansions Intrawest has carried out at its other ski destinations, modelled on the original development at Whistler-Blackcomb.

Blue Mountain also offers downhill mountain biking in the summer months, with bikes and riders taken up hill in gondolas and racks mounted on the Silver Bullet Express. The riders can then choose from 15 different trails which will take them back down to the base of the hill. In the summer months Blue Mountain also maintains a climbing wall, hiking trails, a private beach, a small water park and a miniature golf course

In 2009, Blue Mountain started construction on the Ridge Runner Mountain Coaster, Ontario's first Alpine Coaster and the latest year-round addition to the Resort's seasonal attraction plan. The coaster is located in the central area of the resort, near the Silver Bullet Express chairlift. The Ridge Runner officially opened on weekends beginning March 18, 2011. Members of the media and the first 200 guests to arrive were invited to ride the Ridge Runner for free at the Grand Opening on June 10, 2011.

Capable of achieving speeds up to 42 km/h, the 1,085m Alpine Coaster track slides over bumps, twists through corkscrews and zigzags through the trees of the Niagara Escarpment covering 475 vertical metres. The carts are capable of holding two people at a time, and riders can use a manual brake to control their speed as they descend the track.  The resort has since added a mini-Putt course, a high ropes climbing facility and a zipline facility to be completed in the fall of 2013.

On February 17, 2013 at 8:30 am, Blue Mountain announced that Orchard section of the mountain would be developed to include six additional runs and a six person high-speed chairlift. Construction began in the spring of 2013 and was completed early in the 2013-2014 ski season. The total cost of the expansion was $10 million.  The Orchard opened to the public on December 24, 2013.

Activities 
Blue Mountain Resort offers a wide variety of activities that range from the winter months to the summer ones.

Winter activities 

 Skiing/Snowboarding
 Hike N'Tube
 Sleigh Rides
 Snowshoeing 
 Ice Skating
 Millpond Skating

Summer activities 

 Monterra Golf
 Mountain biking
 Millpond Activity Center
 Low and High Ropes Courses
 Rock Climbing
 Ziplining

Year-round activities 

 Monterra Tennis
 Plunge!
 Ridge Runner
 Caving

Lodging 

Blue Mountain Resort and Village have a wide variety of hotel and apartment accommodations. All are spread out along the base of the mountain or within the Blue Mountain Village. Blue Mountain as a resort features a shuttle bus service, providing guests foot access to the entire mountain, as well as easy access to the various Base Lodges and chairlifts. Some resorts located in and by the village are Blue Mountain Resort, Embarc Blue Mountain, and Westin Trillium House.

Blue Mountain Village 
Situated at the base of Silver Bullet, the Blue Mountain Village is a pedestrian village that allows ski-in accommodations for food and beverage, shopping, as well as lodging. The Village is made up of excellent local full service restaurants including Copper Blue's, Rusty's, Fire Hall Pizza, Tholos, Mother Tongue, Kaytoo, Wild Wing, Northwinds & Magnones as well as a host of grab and go options and fantastic retail shops. More recently Axe throwing has been added to the Village as well as a cannabis dispensary.  As the main hub of Blue Mountain, the Village also holds the main stage for events and concerts that come to the area.

Trails 
Blue Mountain has 42 trails covering over 364 acres of skiable terrain. 

 (g) – gladed trail with trees
 (m) – trail with moguls regularly when conditions provide
 (n) - trail with night skiing

Major events
FIS Freestyle Skiing World Cup - Ski Cross - 2010, 2011, 2012, 2016, 2017, 2019
FIS Snowboard World Cup - Snowboard Cross -  2012, 2013
FIS Snowboard World Cup - Parallel Giant Slalom - 2020, 2023

Major Lifts 
Blue Mountain currently operates seven chairlifts and four beginner magic carpets. Each of the mountain's major areas are served by five Detachable chairlifts, with two fixed-grip chairlifts serving two distinct learning areas.

See also
 List of ski areas and resorts in Canada

References

External links

Alterra Mountain Company
Ski areas and resorts in Ontario
Niagara Escarpment
Tourist attractions in Simcoe County